The McMaster Faculty of Health Sciences is one of six faculties at McMaster University in Hamilton, Ontario, Canada.  The faculty was established in 1974 to oversee the School of Nursing, the School of Medicine, and Graduate programs in health sciences. Today, the Faculty of Health Sciences oversees 5,000 students, 770 full-time faculty, more than 1,800 part-time faculty, and 28 Canada Research Chairs. The faculty is well known for running the most competitive medical and undergraduate program in Canada. The MD program at McMaster University Medical School receives 5000 applications for 203 positions. The BHSc program at McMaster University receives over 3500 applications for 160 positions annually and was ranked the most competitive undergraduate program in Canada by Yahoo Finance in 2016. The faculty was ranked 25th in the world in the 2015 Times Higher Education World Rankings in the Clinical, Pre-Clinical and Health category.

Programs

The faculty currently houses the following programs:
 Michael G. DeGroote School of Medicine
 School of Nursing
 School of Rehabilitation Science
 Midwifery Education Program
 Physician Assistant Education Program
 Bachelor of Health Sciences
 Graduate Program in Biochemistry
 Graduate Program in Medical Sciences
 Graduate Program in Global Health
 Graduate Program in Health Management
 Graduate Program in Neuroscience
 Masters in Public Health 
 Health Policy PhD Program
Integrated Biomedical Engineering and Health Sciences

Facilities

The faculty currently operate a number of facilities on the McMaster's main campus and around Ontario for both education and research. The faculty also operates its own library at the university, known as the Health Sciences Library. The Michael G. DeGroote Centre for Learning and Discovery, which houses the faculty's medical school also houses more than 250 scientists and McMaster's medical institutes including, the Centre for Function Genomics, Centre for Gene Therapeutics, Institute for Cancer and Stem Cell Biology Research, Robert E. Fitzhenry Vector Laboratory, Centre for Asthma and Allergy Research (Allergen), the Michael G. DeGroote Institute for Pain Research and Care and North American Headquarters for West Nile studies.

The faculty also operate two regional campuses in St. Catharines, Ontario and Kitchener, Ontario. The campus in Kitchener, known as the Waterloo Regional Campus, shares facilities with the Health Sciences Campus of the University of Waterloo. The campus in St. Catharines is located at Brock University's Niagara Health and Bioscience Research Complex. Approximately 30 medical students in each year of the program attend each campus. Those who apply to McMaster's School of Medicine are asked to rank their site choice (Hamilton, Niagara Region, Waterloo Region) from first to third, or no preference. Offers of admission to the medical school are made from a rank list irrespective of geographical preference. Subsequent to filling the positions, registrants to the class are offered a position based on their preference and geographical background. The offers given out by McMaster are bound to the assigned site.

The faculty is also currently affiliated with two major academic hospital systems, Hamilton Health Sciences and St. Joseph's Healthcare Hamilton. Combined, the two faculties operate ten hospitals in the Hamilton area, each used as teaching hospital by the faculty. Norfolk General Hospital is the latest hospital to be affiliated with the faculty, becoming an affiliated teaching hospital with the university in 2009.

Reputation
In the 2012 Times Higher Education rankings of clinical, pre-clinical, and health universities, the university ranked 16th in the world and 2nd in Canada, behind Mcgill University. The faculty was placed 82nd in the world and fourth in the country in the U.S. News & World Report university rankings for life sciences and biomedicine. In the field of clinical medicine and pharmacy, the ARWU in 2010 ranked the program 51st–75th in the world and third in Canada. In the 2016 Times Higher Education rankings of clinical, pre-clinical, and health universities, the university ranked 27th in the world, and 3rd in Canada, with University of Toronto taking 1st in Canada and 11th in the world, whereas Mcgill University took 2nd in Canada and 20th in the world.

Research
In 2010, the university was ranked by High Impact Universities 25th out of 500 universities—second in the country—for research performance in the fields of medicine, dentistry, pharmacology, and health sciences. For five years in a row, McMaster has ranked second in Canada for biomedical and health care research revenues. In 2008–2009, Faculty investigators were overseeing $133 million a year in research, much of that research conducted by scientists and physicians who teach in the medical school. For its 2010 rankings, HEEACT ranked McMaster 26th in the world and second on a national scale for scientific papers in clinical medicine. The Faculty of Health Sciences operates several research institutes, including the Farncombe Family Digestive Health Research Institute, the DeGroote Institute for Infectious Disease Research, and the Stem Cell and Cancer Research Institute. In November 2010, researchers at the Stem Cell and Cancer Research Institute turned clumps of human skin into blood cells, which may help alleviate the shortage of blood donors. A portion of Albert Einstein's brain is preserved and held for medical research at the McMaster brain bank. Researchers there have identified differences in his brain that may relate to his genius for spatial and mathematical thinking.

Notes and references

External links
Tour of the Faculty of Health Sciences
Evidence Based Medicine - British Medical Journal

McMaster University